is a private university in Shibata, Miyagi, Japan, established in 1967. The predecessor of the school was founded in 1879. It is the only university specializing in physical education in northern Japan.

Organization

Undergraduate
Faculty of Physical Education
 Department of Physical Education (sports coaching, sports trainer, sports management courses
 Health and Welfare Department (Exercise and Nutrition courses)
 Sports Information Department (Mass Media, sports information strategy)
 Modern Martial Arts Department

Graduate
Graduate School of Sport Sciences (MSc)

Alumni 
 Shuichi Akai (footballer)
 Shinji Doigawa
 Tsuyoshi Furukawa
 Koji Hachisuka
 Hironobu Haga
 Shota Hasunuma
 Sōta Hirayama, footballer
 Junya Hosokawa
 Reiichi Ikegami
 Masaru Inada, skeleton racer
 Dan Ito
 Hideki Uchidate, footballer
 Seiji Kawakami
 Nozomi Komuro
 Kazuhiro Koshi, skeleton racer
 Kento Kumabara, baseball player
 Toshiki Kuroiwa
 Masakatsu Sawa
 Hikaru Minegishi, footballer
 Yoshinobu Minowa
 Shinji Miura
 Tomohiro Moriyama, basketball coach
 Takumi Obara, Triathlete
 Takako Oguchi
 Yoshitaka Ohashi
 Hiroaki Okuno (footballer)
 Keita Saito
 Daisuke Sato (footballer)
 Mitsuhiro Sato
 Shinya Sato, basketball player
 Takuya Sugai
 Yukiya Sugita
 Hiroshi Suzuki (bobsledder)
 Hiroatsu Takahashi
 Naomi Takewaki
 Miki Tanaka, Judoka
 Yoshiichi Watanabe
 Yuji Yaku
 Mitsuo Yamada

External links
 Official website 

 
Educational institutions established in 1879
Private universities and colleges in Japan
Shibata, Miyagi
Universities and colleges in Miyagi Prefecture
1879 establishments in Japan
Sports universities and colleges